Zakaria Abdullai (born 10 October 1989) is a  Ghanaian footballer who plays as a midfielder.

Abdullai began his professional career with Tudu Mighty Jets and was for the season 2009–10 loaned out to Sekondi Wise Fighters. On 20 March 2011, he signed a three-and-a-half-year contract with Swedish side Gefle IF.

References

External links

1989 births
Living people
Association football forwards
Ghanaian footballers
Ghanaian expatriate footballers
Gefle IF players
Husqvarna FF players
Allsvenskan players
Tudu Mighty Jets FC players
Expatriate footballers in Sweden